, better known as , is a Japanese comedian who is represented by the talent agency, Ohta Production. He is part of the comedy trio, Dachou Club.

He is well known for his love of food, in particular beef, and appears often on gourmet programs on TV.

Filmography

TV series

Main

Other

Drama

Films
Director

Actor

CD

Books

Manga

References

External links
 
Dachou Club Official profile  

Japanese comedians
1962 births
Living people
People from Hyōgo Prefecture